John James Pipoly III (born September 5, 1955) is an American botanist and plant collector. He is a leading expert on the systematics and taxonomy of the genus Ardisia within the Myrsinoideae, as well as the family Clusiaceae.

Biology
Pipoly graduated in 1978 with a B.Sc. in botany from Michigan State University. In 1986 he graduated with a Ph.D. in botany from the City University of New York (CUNY) as part of a joint program between CUNY and the New York Botanical Garden (NYBG). His thesis "Monograph of Cybianthus p. p. (Myrsinaceae)" was supervised by Scott A. Mori. In 1986 in the Bronx, Pipoly married Fabiola Monje. The newlyweds arrived in Guyana in April 1986, where John J. Pipoly III was the first resident collector on the "Flora of the Guianas" Program sponsored by the Smithsonian Institution, two universities, and five other institutes. After 13 months in Guyana, where he collected thousands of botanical specimens, he and his wife returned to the US, where he had a post-doctoral position at the National Museum of Natural History. After working as  a Contract Specialist at Environmental Protection Agency Headquarters, he worked at the Missouri Botanical Garden in the early 1990s and at the Botanical Research Institute of Texas from 1995 to 2001. He then became the Urban Horticulture Extension Agent, UF-IFAS/Broward County, Fort Lauderdale, Florida, and an adjunct professor at Nova Southeastern University.

In Fort Lauderdale, Pipoly gave important, expert testimony in a murder case in which plant parts were mixed among human body parts.

Selected publications

References

Wikispecies
 

1955 births
Living people
20th-century American botanists
21st-century American botanists
Plant collectors
Michigan State University alumni
City University of New York alumni
Nova Southeastern University faculty